Crawford Broadcasting is a family-owned media company based in Denver, Colorado. Crawford Broadcasting primarily owns radio stations with Christian, Talk radio and Urban formats.

History
The broadcast company was founded in 1959 by evangelist Dr. Percy B. Crawford. In 1949 Crawford produced his first Christian television broadcast, which aired on the fledgling ABC Television Network.

In 1958, Crawford put together a business plan for the acquisition of seven radio stations. By 1960 seven stations were acquired. These radio stations were in Miami, Florida (WMFP)1; Buffalo, New York (WDCX); Des Moines, Iowa (KDMI)2; Portland, Oregon (KPDQ)3; Chicago, Illinois (WJIZ); Lancaster, Pennsylvania (WDAC) and Detroit, Michigan (WMUZ) were either purchased or had construction permits issued by the FCC. That same year, 1960, Dr. Crawford died and family business was transferred to the leadership of his wife, Ruth Crawford Porter and his son Donald B. Crawford. Between 1968 and 1979 the company expanded by acquiring stations in Birmingham, Alabama (WDJC-FM); Dallas, Texas (KAAM, operated under call letters KPBC at AM1040 but later moved to AM770); and Oklahoma (since divested). In 1980, Crawford Broadcasting purchased a radio station in Los Angeles (KBRT) to further expand its portfolio, and the company launched a further expansion of its station base in 1991.

Notes
1Station now owned by Clear Channel Communications.
2Station now owned by Cumulus Media.
3Station now owned by Salem Communications.

Markets with Crawford-owned stations
Birmingham, Alabama
WDJC-FM - 93.7 - Contemporary Christian
WXJC - 850 - Christian Talk/Programs
WXJC-FM - 101.1 - Gospel/Talk
WYDE - 1260 - Conservative Talk
WYDE-FM - 92.5 - Inspirational Music

Orange County, Los Angeles, California
KBRT - 740 - Christian Talk/Programs

San Diego, California
KNSN - 1240 - Christian Talk/Programs

Modesto, San Francisco, California
KCBC - 770 - Christian Talk/Programs

Denver, Colorado
KLZ - 560 - Conservative Talk
KLDC - 1220 - Gospel Music/Programs
KLTT - 670 - Christian Talk/Programs
KLVZ - 810 - Pop Classics

Chicago, Illinois
WYCA - 102.3 - Christian Talk/Programs & Gospel
WSRB - 106.3 - Urban AC
WPWX - 92.3 - Urban

Rockford, Illinois
WYRB - 106.3 - Rhythmic Contemporary

Detroit, Michigan
WMUZ - 1200 - Inspirational/Christian Talk
WMUZ-FM - 103.5 - Contemporary Christian Music/Talk
WCHB - 1340 - Gospel Music/Programs
WRDT - 560 - Christian Talk/Programs

Buffalo, New York
WDCX-FM - 99.5 - Christian Talk/Programs/Music
WDCZ - 970 - Christian Talk/Programs/Music (simulcast with WDCX)

Rochester, New York
WDCX - 990 - Christian Talk/Programs/Music

References

External links
Official Site of Crawford Broadcasting

Radio broadcasting companies of the United States
Companies established in 1959